Richard Hannigan was a Scottish professional association footballer who played as a winger during the late 1890s.

References

Year of birth unknown
Scottish footballers
Association football midfielders
Burnley F.C. players
Arsenal F.C. players
Notts County F.C. players
English Football League players
Year of death missing